From Now On may refer to:

Film
From Now On (1920 film), an American film of 1920
From Now On (film), a 2007 Portuguese film directed by Catarina Ruivo

Music

Albums
From Now On (Jaki Graham album) or the title song, 1989
From Now On (Robin S. album), 1997
From Now On (Sonny Fortune album) or the title song, 1996
From Now On (Will Young album) or the title song, 2002
From Now On..., by Glenn Hughes, or the title song, 1994
From Now On (EP), by Dreezy, or the title song, 2015
From Now On, by Petula Clark, 2016
From Now On New Songs + Best Selection, by Nicholas Teo, 2008

Songs
"From Now On" (Lil Baby song), 2022
"From Now On", by Band-Maid from Unleash, 2022
"From Now On", by the Features from The Twilight Saga: Breaking Dawn – Part 1 film soundtrack, 2011
"From Now On", by Lala Hsu from The Inner Me, 2017
"From Now On", by Supertramp from Even in the Quietest Moments..., 1977
"From Now On", from the film The Greatest Showman, 2017
"From Now On", written by Cole Porter for the musical Leave It to Me!, 1938